Kəhrizoba is a village in the municipality of Təpəcənnət in the Shaki Rayon of Azerbaijan.

References

Populated places in Shaki District